Daniel O'Donnell (born 1961) is an Irish singer.

Daniel or Danny O'Donnell may also refer to: 
 Daniel O'Donnell (Irish Brigade) (1666–1735), brigadier-general in the Irish Brigade in the French service
 Daniel J. O'Donnell (born 1960), American legislator from the state of New York
 Danny O'Donnell (footballer, born 1986), English footballer
 Danny O'Donnell (footballer, born 1939), Scottish footballer